Atypidae, also known as atypical tarantulas or purseweb spiders, is a spider family containing only three genera. They are accomplished ambush predators that spend most of their time in a sock-like, silken retreat on the ground from where they kill their prey.

Distribution
Sphodros and Atypus occur in North America, while Atypus and Calommata occur in Asia and Africa. Only Atypus species are found in Europe. Atypus affinis, Atypus muralis, and Atypus piceus are the only mygalomorph spiders found in northwestern Europe.

Biology
Atypus builds a silken tube parallel to the surface of the ground. While up to 8 cm of the tube lie on the ground, about 20 cm are buried vertically. The spider rests at the bottom of the tube. When prey walks on the exposed part, the spider, alerted by the vibrations, stabs the prey through the silk, cuts the web and drags the prey inside to be eaten. Calommata species, instead of building a purse web, live in burrows.
Sphodros spp. usually prop their tubes against a tree trunk.

Atypical tarantulas have huge chelicerae for their size and relatively long spinnerets (although not as long as those found in diplurids). The males are sometimes brightly colored and wander around looking for females in their tubes. The females are reddish-brown or dark-colored.

During the breeding season for A. affinis, the male leaves his own burrow and goes in search of females. When he finds the burrow of a female, he tentatively taps on the wall of the purse web, and if the female is receptive, he ventures into the confines of the burrow. The two spiders mate and cohabit until the male dies, when the female eats him. The female makes an egg sac and hangs it in her burrow. The next summer, the eggs hatch, and the spring after that, the spiderlings leave their mother's burrow and wander off to find a suitable place to build a lair of their own.

Southeast Asian Atypus species have a body length of 7 to 21 mm in females, and about 12 mm in males. Calommata spp. of this region grow from 23 to 30 mm in females, and only about 7 mm in males.

Genera
, the World Spider Catalog accepts the following genera:

Atypus Latreille, 1804 — Britain to Ukraine, Asia, North Africa, United States
Calommata Lucas, 1837 — Asia, South Africa
Sphodros Walckenaer, 1835 — North America

See also
 List of Atypidae species

References

External links

Spiders of NW-Europe
Richman, D. B. 2003. Some Spiders - Photograph of Sphodros

Atypidae
Mygalomorphae families